Symmes Creek is a  tributary of the Ohio River in southern Ohio in the United States.

Symmes Creek rises in Bloomfield Township in southeastern Jackson County and flows generally southward through Madison Township in Jackson County; Greenfield, Perry, and Walnut townships in Gallia County; and Symmes, Aid, Mason, Lawrence, Windsor, and Union townships in Lawrence County, through a portion of the Ironton Unit of the Wayne National Forest and past the communities of Waterloo, Aid, and Willow Wood.  It joins the Ohio River at the village of Chesapeake, opposite downtown Huntington, West Virginia.

The United States Board on Geographic Names settled on "Symmes Creek" as the stream's name in 1902.  According to the Geographic Names Information System, it has also been known historically as "Simms," "Big Creek," and "Symms Creek."

Flow rate
At the United States Geological Survey's stream gauge in Aid, the annual mean flow of Symmes Creek between November 2000 and September 2005 was 426 ft³/s (12 m³/s).  The highest recorded flow during the period was 7,100 ft³/s (201 m³/s) on May 19, 2001.  The lowest recorded flow was 1 ft³/s (0 m³/s) on September 18, 2001.

See also
List of rivers of Ohio

References

Rivers of Ohio
Tributaries of the Ohio River
Rivers of Gallia County, Ohio
Rivers of Jackson County, Ohio
Rivers of Lawrence County, Ohio